Maria Johanna (Marjan) Oudema (born 1958) was president of Utrecht University until 2017. As of 2018, she was also a director of the Concertgebouw, the Rijksmuseum, Solvay SA, Aalberts (then Aalberts Industries) and SHV Holdings and was a director of Norwegian oil and gas company Equinor (formerly Statoil) from 2012 until 2018. She was previously a member of the executive committee of Akzo Nobel and executive director Strip Products Division at Corus Group (now Tata Steel Europe).

She has a law degree from the University of Groningen and a Master of Business Administration from the University of Rochester (New York) and Erasmus University Rotterdam.

References

1958 births
Dutch business executives
Equinor people
Rijksmuseum Amsterdam
Academic staff of Utrecht University
University of Rochester alumni
Erasmus University Rotterdam alumni
Living people